Arthur J. Logan became the adjutant general of Hawaii in January 2015. His promotion to major general was confirmed at the federal level by the U.S. Senate on September 26, 2019.

References

External links 

Year of birth missing (living people)
Living people
People from Hawaii
Hawaii Pacific University alumni
United States Army War College alumni
United States Army generals
National Guard (United States) generals